Jan Awei is a moribund Jukunoid language of Nigeria. It had around 12 speakers in 1997 and was spoken in an area West of the Muri Mountains in the far South of Gombe State, however the precise location is unknown.

References

Jukunoid languages
Endangered Niger–Congo languages
Languages of Nigeria